Pomiechówek railway station is a railway station in Pomiechówek, Nowy Dwór, Masovian, Poland. It is served by Koleje Mazowieckie.

References

Station article at kolej.one.pl

Railway stations in Warsaw